Lampropteryx suffumata, the water carpet, is a moth of the family Geometridae. It is found from Europe to the Altai Mountains, Khabarovsk Krai and the Kamchatka Peninsula  in the far east of Russia, and Hokkaido, Japan. In 2000, the species was discovered in Alaska, USA, and then in 2008 DNA-barcoding analysis of museum specimens identified several Canadian specimens, thereby extending the geographical range from Ireland in the west, across Eurasia, to the west of North America. The habitat consists of damp woodland, grassy areas, chalk downland and scrubland.

Description
The wingspan is 25–32 mm. The ground colour is brownish. Between the wingbase and the midfield, as well as between the central and margin field is a whitish lateral band. The dark midfield is serrated on both sides. The outer cross-line limiting the midfield and shows a clearly protruding double wave. The margin field is heavily obscured below the apex. The hind wings are pale grey and have a  strongly curved dark cross line. Adult caterpillars have a brown basic coloration. On the dorsum, there is reddish-brown to black-brown angled spots. The rear segments are lighter brown.

In northern Europe, adults are in the wing from March to June in one generation.

The larvae feed on Galium species and can be found in May and June. It overwinters in the pupal stage.

Subspecies
Lampropteryx suffumata suffumata
Lampropteryx suffumata arctica Sparre-Schneider, 1895

Similar species
Lampropteryx otregiata

References

External links
Lepidoptera of Belgium

Cidariini
Moths described in 1775
Moths of Asia
Moths of Europe
Taxa named by Michael Denis
Taxa named by Ignaz Schiffermüller